The Fashion Mall at Keystone, known better as The Fashion Mall, is an upscale shopping center in the northeast section of the city of Indianapolis, Indiana. The mall is located off I-465 at 86th Street and Keystone. The mall is considered the heart of the Keystone at the Crossing district. Developed, managed, and owned by Indianapolis-based Simon Property Group, the anchor stores are Nordstrom, Pottery Barn, The North Face, Apple Store, Urban Outfitters, Restoration Hardware, Crate & Barrel, and Saks Fifth Avenue. The Fashion Mall consists of two two-story buildings. When the mall first opened, they were linked by a glass archway called "The Crossing" that also served as the mall's food court. The former archway known as "The Crossing" has since been converted into additional retail space. The mall offers 123 specialty shops and restaurants. Over 40% of the stores in the mall have their sole location in the state of Indiana there. About 97% of the store's retail area was in use at the end of 2006.

Sometimes the area is called Keystone/Clearwater, which refers to the large neighboring Clearwater Crossing mixed-use development named after the nearby Lake Clearwater.

Parisian's parent company, Saks Incorporated, sold the entire chain of stores to Belk. Belk thus sold the location to Nordstrom. In summer 2007, the store was renovated and reopened as the state's second Nordstrom location. The process was similar to Saks Fifth Avenue's renovation and replacement of Jacobson's old store in 2002.

History

The Fashion Mall was adjacent to its companion shopping center called The Bazaar, a building of labyrinthine corridors housing family-run stores. The Fashion Mall underwent several renovations and expansions over the years, and The Bazaar was eventually demolished to make way for the growing shopping center. Over the years, numerous retail centers and stand-alone restaurants have been built both in the mixed-use development where the Fashion Mall is located and all along the 86th Street corridor. The Fashion Mall/Clearwater Crossing area now provides a continuous retail corridor which merges with the Castleton Square Mall shopping area located almost  to the east. The Fashion Mall has become a regional high-end shopping destination, standing two stories high and covering  in two separate buildings. The buildings are connected by an archway called "The Crossing" which served as the complex's food court until renovations in 2011-2012. The food court was moved to new space immediately to the west.

The Fashion Mall has had many retailers in its past. Its old anchor, Jacobson's, was the only store located in the state of Indiana. It was replaced by Saks Fifth Avenue in 2002, which is also the only store in the state. Parisian at The Fashion Mall, which is one of two stores (the other location at Circle Centre was rebranded as Carson Pirie Scott & Company) in the state, was converted to Nordstrom in fall of 2008, now the only such store in the state, following the  closure of the Circle Centre Mall store in 2011.

The largest stores in the mall are Nordstrom and Saks Fifth Avenue. Crate & Barrel opened in late 2005, and Tiffany & Co. opened in 2006. The mall had $586 of sales per square foot in 2005.

References

Tourist attractions in Indianapolis
Shopping malls in Indiana
Buildings and structures in Indianapolis
Shopping malls established in 1973
1973 establishments in Indiana